Michael Hazelwood  (born 14 April 1958) is a retired British water skier and a was the world overall champion in 1977.

Career
In July 1978, Hazelwood scored 3,038 points to win men's overall title in the Masters waterskiing tournament at Callaway Gardens, Georgia. In 1980 Mike Hazelwood set his first World Record in the jump event with 59.4 metres. He went on to break the World record twice more. In 1981 Britain hosted World Tournament Championships and Hazelwood won the gold in Jump. He competed as a member of the British team in eight consecutive World Championships, the longest competitive record at that level of anyone who has ever won a World Overall Championship. During that period, from 1973 to 1987, Hazelwood won three gold medals, including the one in 1977 for overall, five silver medals, and two bronze medals. As one of the most successful competitors of his long era, the British Crown with the title MBE honored him.

Jumping was always Hazelwood's strongest event, which he demonstrated by setting three world records between 1980 and 1986. Hazelwood was the dominant skier in Europe for over a decade, winning the European Overall Championship eight times between 1976 and 1986. In 1986, Hazelwood set a world record in distance jumping by soaring 203 feet at the Coors Light Water Ski Tour stop at the Iron Man Water Ski Classic in Birmingham, Alabama.

In 1994 Hazelwood appeared as a stunt double in the movie My Father the Hero. He also appeared on the cover of several waterski periodicals including Waterski Magazine.

In addition to water skiing, Hazelwood was an avid motocross competitor and cyclist. He amassed numerous motocross trophies during his competitive years.

Retirement
Hazelwood retired in 1988 due to problems with a bad back. He was diagnosed with two stress fractures in his lower back by the time he was 16. From 1988, he ran a ski school in Lake Hamilton, Florida, until 1996, when he moved with his wife Renee, son Daniel and daughter Roxanne to Ocala. In March 1993, Hazelwood developed a new ski that he believed could bring him success at the Carlsberg Masters and attempted a comeback. Hazelwood later worked in a management position for Pilot Truckstops LLC near Ocala, Florida.
He has since returned to live in Lincoln in the UK.

References

1958 births
Living people
British water skiers
World Games silver medalists
Competitors at the 1981 World Games
Members of the Order of the British Empire